Vettre is a coastal village situated on the shores of the Oslo Fjord. It is proximal to Asker Sentrum and not far from Heggedal and also Borgen.

Villages in Akershus
Asker